Melanie Stokke (born 1 October 1996) is a Norwegian tennis player.

Stokke has won four singles and three doubles titles on the ITF Circuit. On 30 April 2018, she reached her best singles ranking of world No. 261. On 30 October 2017, she peaked at No. 348 in the WTA doubles rankings.

Playing for the Norway Fed Cup team, Stokke has a win–loss record of 22–6.

ITF Circuit finals

Singles: 11 (4 titles, 7 runner–ups)

Doubles: 8 (3 titles, 5 runner–ups)

References

External links

 
 
 

1996 births
Living people
Sportspeople from Oslo
Norwegian female tennis players
Norwegian people of Vietnamese descent
Sportspeople of Vietnamese descent
21st-century Norwegian women